Andrew Capobianco (born October 13, 1999) is an American Olympic diver. 

In 2021 he qualified with his partner Michael Hixon for the U.S. Olympic Diving Team, to compete in the men's synchronised 3m springboard. Later during the Olympic Trials he also qualified for the 2020/2021 Summer Olympics in Tokyo in the Individual 3m dive. 

At the Tokyo Olympics, Capobianco and Hixon won the silver medal in the men's synchronised 3m springboard, while Capobianco finished 10th out of 12 divers in the finals of the individual 3m springboard, from an original field of 29 in the competition. 

He participated at the 2019 World Aquatics Championships, winning a bronze medal.

He currently attends and competes for Indiana University Bloomington, where he has earned All-American honors seven times.

References

1999 births
Living people
American male divers
People from Mineola, New York
Sportspeople from Nassau County, New York
World Aquatics Championships medalists in diving
Pan American Games medalists in diving
Pan American Games bronze medalists for the United States
Divers at the 2019 Pan American Games
Medalists at the 2019 Pan American Games
Olympic divers of the United States
Divers at the 2020 Summer Olympics
Medalists at the 2020 Summer Olympics
Olympic medalists in diving
Olympic silver medalists for the United States in diving
American people of Italian descent
Indiana Hoosiers men's divers